Andrae Malone Patterson (born November 12, 1975) is an American former professional basketball player who currently works with the Portland Trail Blazers as the assistant General Manager. He played college basketball with Indiana.

College career
Patterson played college basketball at Indiana University under head coach Bobby Knight.

Professional career
The Minnesota Timberwolves drafted him in the second round of the 1998 NBA Draft with the 46th overall pick.  He played in 40 career regular season games with Minnesota, through the 1999-2000 season.  Following his NBA career, Patterson had several stops in Europe, including Zadar, Ricoh Manresa, Ironi Ashkelon, Panellinios, and most notably Adecco Estudiantes, before joining Aigaleo in 2007.

On July 1, 2015, Patterson joined the Utah Jazz front office as player personnel/player programs coordinator.

References

External links
 
 

1975 births
Living people
African-American basketball players
Aigaleo B.C. players
American men's basketball players
American expatriate basketball people in Croatia
American expatriate basketball people in Greece
American expatriate basketball people in Israel
American expatriate basketball people in Spain
Basketball coaches from California
Basketball players from Riverside, California
Bàsquet Manresa players
CB Estudiantes players
Idaho Stampede coaches
Indiana Hoosiers men's basketball players
Ironi Ashkelon players
KK Zadar players
Liga ACB players
McDonald's High School All-Americans
Minnesota Timberwolves draft picks
Minnesota Timberwolves players
Panellinios B.C. players
Parade High School All-Americans (boys' basketball)
Power forwards (basketball)
Sportspeople from Riverside, California
UT Arlington Mavericks men's basketball coaches
21st-century African-American sportspeople
20th-century African-American sportspeople